Andreas Endresen may refer to:
 Andreas Endresen (judge)
 Andreas Endresen (footballer)